Decarthron is a genus of ant-loving beetles in the family Staphylinidae. There are more than 20 described species in Decarthron.

Species
These 25 species belong to the genus Decarthron:

 Decarthron abnorme (LeConte, 1849)
 Decarthron anneae Park, 1958
 Decarthron brendeli Casey, 1887
 Decarthron brundeli Casey
 Decarthron defectum Park, 1958
 Decarthron discolor Brendel, 1890
 Decarthron exiguum Notman, 1920
 Decarthron exsectum Brendel, 1865
 Decarthron formiceti (LeConte, 1849)
 Decarthron howdeni Park, 1956
 Decarthron inusitatum Park, 1958
 Decarthron justum Park, 1958
 Decarthron laurenticum Casey, 1897
 Decarthron longulum (LeConte, 1849)
 Decarthron marinum Brendel, 1893
 Decarthron mimicum Park, 1958
 Decarthron nigrocavum Park, 1958
 Decarthron reciprocum Park, 1958
 Decarthron rostratum Park, 1958
 Decarthron scarificatum Brendel, 1893
 Decarthron setosum Bowman, 1934
 Decarthron snowi Park, 1958
 Decarthron stigmosum Brendel, 1865
 Decarthron varicum Park, 1958
 Decarthron velutinum (LeConte, 1849)

References

Further reading

 
 

Pselaphinae
Articles created by Qbugbot